Mosquito Creek is a stream in the U.S. state of Wisconsin. It is a tributary to the Wisconsin River.

Mosquito Creek was named for the swarms of mosquitoes in the wetlands along its course.

References

Rivers of Portage County, Wisconsin
Rivers of Wood County, Wisconsin
Rivers of Wisconsin